College of Engineering, Kottarakkara (established in 2004), commonly known as CEK, is an engineering institute in the state of Kerala, India.  The college is affiliated with the APJ Abdul Kalam Technological University and the courses are recognised by AICTE.

Overview 

The college was set up under the auspices of the Institute of Human Resources Development (IHRD) and is recognized by the All India Council for Technical Education, New Delhi and affiliated to CUSAT.The college is located near Navodaya school and ETC at Thrikkannamangal. Kottarakkara is famous as the birthplace of Kathakali.

Location 

The college is located at Thrikkannamangal which is 3 km from Kottarakkara KSRTC bus stand and 2 km away from railway station.

Courses 

There are two four-year bachelor of technology degrees that are taught at this college.
 Computer Science and Engineering (formerly, Computer Engineering)
 Electronics and Communication Engineering (formerly, Electronics Engineering)

Library 
The college has a library with more than 5000 volumes of books and more than 2000 titles.

Hostel Facility 
The college has a well-facilitated hostel with security.

Departments 

There are two departments that are affiliated to the college.

 Department of Electronics and Communication Engineering
 Department of Computer Science and Engineering

References

External links
CEKRA Official Website
IHRD Website

All India Council for Technical Education
Institute of Human Resources Development
Engineering colleges in Kollam district
Educational institutions established in 2004
2004 establishments in Kerala